HKUST-1 (HKUST ⇒ Hong Kong University of Science and Technology), which is also called MOF-199, is a material in the class of metal-organic frameworks (MOFs). Metal-organic frameworks are crystalline materials, in which metals are linked by ligands (so-called linker molecules) to form repeating coordination motives extending in three dimensions. The HKUST-1 framework is built up of dimeric metal units, which are connected by benzene-1,3,5-tricarboxylate linker molecules. The paddlewheel unit is the commonly used structural motif to describe the coordination environment of the metal centers and also called secondary building unit (SBU) of the HKUST-1 structure. The paddlewheel is built up of four benzene-1,3,5-tricarboxylate linkers molecules, which bridge two metal centers. One water molecules is coordinated to each of the two metal centers at the axial position of the paddlewheel unit in the hydrated state, which is usually found if the material is handled in air. After an activation process (heating, vacuum), these water molecules can be removed (dehydrated state) and the coordination site at the metal atoms is left unoccupied. This unoccupied coordination site is called coordinatively unsaturated site (CUS) and can be accessed by other molecules.

Structural analogs

Monometallic HKUST-1 analogs 
Cu2+ was used as metal center in the first synthesized HKUST-1 material, but the HKUST-1 structure was also obtained with other metals. The oxidation state of most used metals is +II, which results in a neutral overall framework. In the case of trivalent metals (oxidation state +3), the overall framework is positively charged and requires anions to compensate the charge and guarantee charge neutrality.

Mixed-metal HKUST-1 analogs 
In addition to monometallic HKUST-1 analogs, several mixed-metal HKUST-1 materials were synthesized, in which two metals are incorporated into the framework structure at crystallographically equivalent positions. The incorporation of two metals can be achieved by using both metals for the synthesis (direct synthesis) or by using post-synthetic metal-exchange. For the post-synthetic metal exchange, a monometallic HKUST-1 material is synthesized in the first step. Subsequently, this monometallic HKUST-1 is suspended in a solution containing the second metal, which results in an exchange of metal centers in the framework leading to a mixed-metal HKUST-1.

Theoretically calculated HKUST-1 analogs 
Several HKUST-1 analogs have already been synthesized, but several research groups have investigated the properties of the HKUST-1 structure by means of theoretical calculations. For this purpose, additional metal centers were incorporated into the framework on the theoretical level, which have not been used for the synthesis (e.g. Sc, V, Ti, W, Cd). Theoretical study on a mixed-metal HKUST-1 containing Cu in combination with various other metals (e.g. W, Re, Os, Ir, Pt, Au) were also reported, of which several metal combinations have not been synthesized.

References 

Metal-organic frameworks
Copper(II) compounds